The 48th edition of the World Allround Speed Skating Championships for Women took place on 7 and 8 February 1987 in West Allis at the Wisconsin State Fair Park ice rink.

Title holder was Andrea Schöne-Mitscherlich from East Germany.

Distance medalists

Classification

 * = Fall
 DQ = Disqualified

Source:

References

Attribution
In Dutch

1980s in speed skating
1980s in women's speed skating
1987 World Allround
1987 in women's speed skating